Tabernaemontana columbiensis is a species of plant in the family Apocynaceae. It is found in southeastern Central America, and northwestern South America.

References

columbiensis
Plants described in 1988